is the second season of the Japanese television drama series Liar Game, adapted from a popular manga, known as the Liar Game. In April 2009, a second season of the drama adaptation and a live action movie were announced. The second season began airing in November 2009 and concluded on January 19, 2010. The movie, known as the Liar Game: The Final Stage debuted on March 6, 2010.

Cast

Players

Liar Game Tournament

Plot 
Two years after the events from the previous season, the naive Kanzaki Nao (Erika Toda) and "genius swindler", Akiyama Shinichi (Shota Matsuda), go back to their normal lives until they receive an invitation to resume the Liar Game and compete for entrance to The Final Stage. Besides Kanzaki and Akiyama, the flamboyant Fukunaga (Suzuki Kosuke) returns to the Liar Game and a mysterious but talented psychology professor, Katsuragi Ryo, (Rinko Kikuchi) enters the Liar Game as Akiyama and Kanzaki's new opponent.

Episodes

Reception

Awards and nominations
 13th Nikkan Sports Drama Grand Prix (Fall 2009): Best Actress - Toda Erika

External links
Official TV Drama Website from Fuji

References

Japanese drama television series
2009 Japanese television series debuts
2010 Japanese television series endings
Fuji TV dramas
Japanese television dramas based on manga
Liar Game
Television shows about gambling
Fraud in television